Chung Misook (born December 25, 1962) is a South Korean voice actress who joined Seoul-based Korean Broadcasting System's voice acting division in 1984.

Role

Broadcast TV
 Pororo the Little Penguin (EBS) - Petty
 Clamp School Detectives (Korea TV Edition, Tooniverse) - Nokoru Imonoyama
 Pita-Ten (Korea TV Edition, Tooniverse) - Misha
 Futari wa Pretty Cure (Korea TV Edition, SBS) - Cure Black/Nagisa Misumi (Mook Ha-ram)
 Jang Geum's Dream (Korea TV Edition, MBC) - Seo Jang Geum
 One Piece (Korea TV Edition, KBS) - Nami
 Naruto (Korea TV Edition, Tooniverse) - Hitomi Uchiha
 Sailor Moon (Crew Folding) - Sailor Mercury
 Tokyo Mew Mew (Korea TV Edition, SBS) - Ichigo Momomiya
 InuYasha (Korea TV Edition, AnioneTV) - Kagome Higurashi (Yoo Ga-young)
 Shaman King (Korea TV Edition, AnioneTV) - Hao Asakura
 Kamikaze Kaito Jeanne (Korea TV Edition, Tooniverse) - Maron Kusakabe/Kaito Jeanne
 Magic Knight Rayearth (Korea TV Edition, SBS) - Hikaru Shidou (Sunny/Joo Eun-vit)
 The Irresponsible Captain Tylor (Korea TV Edition, Tooniverse)
 Nurse Angel Ririka SOS (Korea TV Edition, KBS) - Ririka Moriya
 Digimon Adventure (Korea TV Edition, KBS) - Taichi Kamiya (Shin Tae-il)
 Astro Boy (Korea TV Edition, SBS) - Astro Boy
 Cowboy Bebop (Korea TV Edition, Tooniverse) - Faye Valentine
 Erementar Gerad (Korea TV Edition, Tooniverse) - Cisqua
 Kanon (Korea TV Edition, Animax) - Nayuki Minase
 Mahojin Guru Guru (Korea TV Edition, Tooniverse) - Kukuri
 Element Hunters (Korea TV Edition, KBS) - Ren Karas
 Doug (Korea TV Edition) - Patti Mayonnaise 
 Danny Phantom (Korea TV Edition) - Sam
 Dragon Tales (Korea TV Edition) - Emmy
 Flowering Heart (Korea TV Edition) - Ari Jin 
 You're Under Arrest (Korea TV Edition, Tooniverse) - Noh Han-na
 The Fairly OddParents (Korea TV Edition) - Timmy Turner
 Hello Kitty's Paradise (Korea TV Edition, KBS) - Hello Kitty

Movie dubbing
Harry Potter (replacing Emma Watson, Korea TV Edition, SBS)
The Sixth Sense (replacing Haley Joel Osment, Korea TV Edition, KBS)
Interview with the Vampire (replacing Kirsten Dunst, Korea TV Edition, MBC)
Jumanji (replacing Kirsten Dunst, Korea TV Edition, SBS)
Leon (replacing Natalie Portman, Korea TV Edition, KBS)
Demolition Man (replacing Sandra Bullock, Korea TV Edition, SBS)
Roman Holiday (replacing Audrey Hepburn, Korea TV Edition, SBS)
Beauty and the Beast: The Enchanted Christmas (playing Belle, Walt Disney Pictures)
Pocahontas II: Journey to a New World (playing Pocahontas, Walt Disney Pictures)
The Lion King II: Simba's Pride (playing Adult Kiara, Walt Disney Pictures
Anastasia (playing Anastasia "Anya", 20th Century Fox)
Mulan (playing Mulan, Walt Disney Pictures)
The Prince of Egypt (playing Miriam, Dreamworks Animation)
Finding Nemo (playing Dory, Pixar)
Bolt (playing Mittens, Walt Disney Pictures)
Finding Dory (playing Dory, Stan's wife, Pixar)

Games
Magna Carta: Crimson Stigmata - Reith
The War of Genesis Side Story II: Tempest - Elizabeth Pandragon
Girlfriend of Steel - Asuka Langley Soryu
Elsword - Rena

References

External links
Jeong Mi Sook Fan Site (in Korean)
Jeong Mi Sook Fan Cafe (in Korean)
KBS Voice Acting division Jeong Mi Sook blog (in Korean)

1962 births
Living people
South Korean voice actresses
20th-century South Korean actresses
21st-century South Korean actresses